This is a table of articles covering the environment by year. They discuss topics such as environmental law, conservation, environmentalism and environmental issues.


1900s
1900   1901   1902   
1903   1904   1905   
1906   1907   1908   
1909
1910   1911   1912   
1913   1914   1915   
1916   1917   1918   
1919
1920   1921   1922   
1923   1924   1925   
1926   1927   1928   
1929
1930   1931   1932   
1933   1934   1935   
1936   1937   1938   
1939
1940   1941   1942   
1943   1944   1945   
1946   1947   1948   
1949
1950   1951   1952   
1953   1954   1955   
1956   1957   1958   
1959
1960   1961   1962   
1963   1964   1965   
1966   1967   1968   
1969
1970   1971   1972   
1973   1974   1975   
1976   1977   1978   
1979
1980   1981   1982   
1983   1984   1985   
1986   1987   1988   
1989
1990   1991   1992   
1993   1994   1995   
1996   1997   1998   
1999

2000s
2000   2001   2002   
2003   2004   200g5   
2006   2007   2008   
2009 
2010   2011   2012   
2013   2014   2015   
2016

See also
Human impact on the environment
List of environmental issues